The Antonov An-12 (Russian: Антонов Ан-12; NATO reporting name: Cub) is a four-engined turboprop transport aircraft designed in the Soviet Union. It is the military version of the Antonov An-10 and has many variants. For more than three decades the An-12 was the standard medium-range cargo and paratroop transport aircraft of the Soviet air forces. A total of 1,248 were eventually built.

Design and development

Developed from the Antonov An-8, the An-12 was a military version of the An-10 passenger transport. The first prototype An-12 flew in December 1957 and entered Soviet military service in 1959. Initially, the aircraft was produced at the State Aviation Factory in Irkutsk. From 1962, production was transferred to Tashkent, where 830 were built. Later, production moved to Voronezh and Kazan.

In military use, the An-12 has capacity for up to 100 fully equipped paratroopers or 20,000 kg (44,090 lb) of cargo, which is loaded through the rear loading ramp/door.

In terms of configuration, size, and capability, the aircraft is similar to the United States-built Lockheed C-130 Hercules. Soviet military and former-Soviet An-12s have a defensive tail gun turret.

Chinese production

In the 1960s, China purchased several An-12 aircraft from the Soviet Union, along with a license to assemble the aircraft locally. Due to the Sino-Soviet split, the Soviet Union withdrew its technical assistance. The Xi'an Aircraft Company and Xi'an Aircraft Design Institute reverse-engineered the An-12 for local production, and the first flight of a Chinese-assembled An-12 was delayed until 1974 after USSR ceased production in 1973.

In 1981, the Chinese version of the An-12, designated Y-8, finally entered production. Since then, the Y-8 has become one of China's most popular military and civilian transport/cargo aircraft, with many variants produced and exported. A Tu-16/H-6 bomber navigator cockpit design was chosen for the Y-8 instead of the original An-12 shorter navigator cockpit design, as the H-6 bomber had been in serial production for some time. Although the An-12 is no longer in use either in Russia or in Ukraine, the Y-8 is upgraded and produced in China. The latest Y8-F600 is a joint venture between the Shaanxi Aircraft Company, Antonov Aeronautical Scientific Technical Complex (ASTC), and Pratt & Whitney Canada. The Y8-F600 has a redesigned fuselage, western avionics, PW150B turboprop engines with an R-408 propeller system, and a two-crew glass cockpit.

Operational history

Soviet Air Forces
The Aircraft first took flight in 1957 and was produced in the USSR until 1973. It was used in a variety of roles from search and rescue operations to equipment transportation. Its most significant use was seen during the Soviet-Afghan War. Among Soviet Soldiers, it was infamously known that the plane would take off from Afghanistan to Tashkent with "Cargo 200" or coffins with the bodies of deceased soldiers. To this regard the aircraft was nicknamed "Black Tulip" (Russian: «Чёрный тюльпан»).

Variants

In addition to its basic cargo transport role, the An-12 was adapted as a platform for a wide variety of specialist tasks and some 30 different variants were produced. Upgrades included increased take-off weights and additional fuel capacity. The upgraded variant An-12BP became the standard tactical transport of the Soviet and other air forces. In 2019, it was announced at the military "Army-2019" Forum that Russia started working on an armed ground-attack and close air support variant of the An-12, similar to the AC-130. In 2021, it was announced that the gunship will not be based on the An-12 after all, as it did not meet the requirements for a "flying gunner."

Operators
Currently the An-12 is popular with cargo operators, especially those in the CIS, Africa and the Indian subcontinent.

Civil operators

On 12 January 2009, the United Arab Emirates (UAE) issued a temporary ban of the An-12 from flying over their airspace following runway incursions at Sharjah International Airport and the GCAA has advised operators to stop using the aircraft. The ban was made permanent in Feb 2010.

Current

 Air Armenia

 Ruby Star Airways

 Air One (Mexico)

 ATRAN Cargo Airlines
 SAT Airlines

 Air People International

 Aerovis Airlines
 Antonov Airlines
 CAVOK Air
 Motor Sich Airlines
 Ukraine Air Alliance
 Volare Airlines

 SRX, (still operated by Avialeasing)

Former

 Alada

 Balkan Bulgarian Airlines
 Air Sofia

 CAAC Airlines; see also Shaanxi Y8

 Egyptair

 Darta

 Air Guinee

 Ghana Airways The sole An-12 was delivered in October 1961. Withdrawn from use in 1962 and returned to the Soviet Union in 1963.

 Iraqi Airways

 Interisland Airlines

 LOT Polish Airlines

 Avial Aviation

 United International Airlines

 Azza Transport
 Badr Airlines
 Juba Air Cargo

Military operators

Current

 People's Air and Air Defence Force of Angola

 Chadian Air Force

 Ethiopian Air Force

 Myanmar Air Force

 Nigerian Air Force – 12 An-12s in service

 Russian Air Force
 Russian Naval Aviation

 Sudanese Air Force

 Uzbekistan Air and Air Defence Forces

Former

 Algerian Air Force

 Armenian Air Force

 The Afghan Air Force operated 12 from 1981 through 2001. One of their An-12s which defected to Pakistan is preserved at PAF Museum, Karachi

 Bangladesh Air Force operated from 1973 to 1980s, now all retired

 Cote d'Ivoire Air Force

 Czech Air Force

 Czechoslovakian Air Force : Czechoslovakia's fleet numbering two was divided evenly between the Czech Republic and Slovak Republic upon split with Slovakia. All CzAF An-12s were phased out of active service in the 1990s.

 Egyptian Air Force - 22 acquired

 The Indian Air Force inducted the first of these aircraft in 1961, when it raised No.44 Squadron "The Himalayan Geese". Six of these aircraft soon took part in airlifting army reinforcements to Ladakh during the Sino-Indian War of 1962. The An-12 was subsequently used to raise No.25 Squadron. The An-12s were also used as heavy bombers during the Indo-Pakistani War of 1971. All IAF An-12s were phased out of active service in the 1990s. One of them is preserved at the Indian Air Force Museum, Palam, New Delhi.

 Indonesian Air Force – Retired in 1970

 Iraqi Air Force – Retired in 2003

 Royal Jordanian Air Force

 Mongolian Air Force - Retired 12 An-12

 Polish Air Force used two An-12B from 1966 until 1977 (crashed) and 1995

 Slovak Air Force received one An-12BP registered 2209 in 1993. It was sold to Moldavia in 1999 and now serves with Angolan Air Force.

 Yemeni Air Force

 The Soviet fleet was dispersed among many of the Soviet Union's successor states.
 Soviet Air Force
 Soviet Naval Aviation

 Syrian Air Force

 Tanzania Air Force Command

Turkmenistan Air Forces

 Ukrainian Air Force
 Ukrainian Naval Aviation

 SFR Yugoslav Air Force

Accidents and incidents

Specifications (An-12)

See also

References

Footnotes

Sources
 
 
 .

External links

 List of all An-12 aircraft used by Polish Air Force
 Pictures of An-12
 Hundreds of An-12 photos
 Y-8 Transporter Intro, AirForceWorld.com
 Russianplanes.net
 1968 plane crash victim's remains recovered

An-012
1950s Soviet cargo aircraft
1950s Soviet military transport aircraft
Four-engined tractor aircraft
Four-engined turboprop aircraft
High-wing aircraft
Aircraft first flown in 1957